Ampang LRT station is a light rapid transit station operated by rapidKL serving the Ampang Line in Ampang, Selangor, Malaysia, just outside the eastern boundary of Kuala Lumpur. It is the eastern terminus for passenger services on the line. This station was opened in 1996, along with 17 other LRT stations.

Features
Ticketing machines and a CIMB Bank ATM were installed at the station concourse, as well as a convenience store. Ramps linking the Jalan Ampang bus station, the taxi stand, the car park area and the station concourse were added in 2012.

A multi-storey car park, similar to the one at Gombak, was added in 2014. Only Touch 'n Go cards were accepted for payment at the carpark, which charges a flat rate of MYR 4 per day.

History
The station was opened on December 16, 1996, as part of the first phase of the STAR system's opening, alongside 13 adjoining stations along the Sultan Ismail-Ampang route. This station also housed a depot for the LRT train services and maintenances.

Ampang-Chan Sow Lin shuttle service
Between July and December 2016, upon the opening of the Puchong Perdana-Putra Heights stretch and the full deployment of the new CSR Zhuzhou trains on the Sentul Timur-Putra Heights stretch, the old Adtranz trains in use since 1996 were reduced to serve only the Ampang-Chan Sow Lin stretch while pending the completion of the signalling system in the line. Commuters going from Ampang to Kuala Lumpur city centre (i.e. Masjid Jamek) or vice versa were required to alight at Chan Sow Lin and switch from the Adtranz trains to the new CSR Zhuzhou trains.

Direct travel between Ampang and Sentul Timur, as it was before July 2016, was restored on 1 December 2016, following the completion of the upgrading of the signalling system on the Ampang-Chan Sow Lin stretch, which also sees the wholesale replacement of the old Adtranz trains with the new CSR Zhuzhou trains.

Yard

The station is also co-located with the Ampang Depot, one of two yards serving the Ampang and Sri Petaling lines.

See also

 List of rail transit stations in Klang Valley

References

External links 
Ampang LRT Station - mrt.com.my

Ampang Line
Railway stations opened in 1996
1996 establishments in Malaysia